In mathematics, in the area of analytic number theory, the Dirichlet eta function is defined by the following Dirichlet series, which converges for any complex number having real part > 0:

This Dirichlet series is the alternating sum corresponding to the Dirichlet series expansion of the Riemann zeta function, ζ(s) — and for this reason the Dirichlet eta function is also known as the alternating zeta function, also denoted ζ*(s).  The following relation holds:

Both Dirichlet eta function and Riemann zeta function are special cases of Polylogarithm.

While the Dirichlet series expansion for the eta function is convergent only for any complex number s with real part > 0, it is Abel summable for any complex number.  This serves to define the eta function as an entire function.  (The above relation and the facts that the eta function is entire and  together show the zeta function is meromorphic with a simple pole at s = 1, and possibly additional poles at the other zeros of the factor , although in fact these hypothetical additional poles do not exist.)

Equivalently, we may begin by defining

which is also defined in the region of positive real part ( represents the Gamma function). This gives the eta function as a Mellin transform.

Hardy gave a simple proof of the functional equation for the eta function, which is

From this, one immediately has the functional equation of the zeta function also, as well as another means to extend the definition of eta to the entire complex plane.

Zeros
The zeros of the eta function include all the zeros of the zeta function: the negative even integers (real equidistant simple zeros); the zeros along the critical line, none of which are known to be multiple and over 40% of which have been proven to be simple, and the hypothetical zeros in the critical strip but not on the critical line, which if they do exist must occur at the vertices of rectangles symmetrical around the x-axis and the critical line and whose multiplicity is unknown.  In addition, the factor  adds an infinite number of complex simple zeros, located at equidistant points on the line , at  where n is any nonzero integer.

Under the Riemann hypothesis, the zeros of the eta function would be located symmetrically with respect to the real axis on two parallel lines , and on the perpendicular half line formed by the negative real axis.

Landau's problem with ζ(s) = η(s)/0 and solutions
However, in the equation

η must be zero at all the points , where the denominator is zero, if the Riemann zeta function is analytic and finite there. The problem of proving this without defining the zeta function first was signaled and left open by E. Landau in his 1909 treatise on number theory: "Whether the eta series is different from zero or not at the points , i.e., whether these are poles of zeta or not, is not readily apparent here."

A first solution for Landau's problem was published almost 40 years later by D. V. Widder in his book The Laplace Transform.

Assuming , for each point  where , we can now define  by continuity as follows,

Integral representations
A number of integral formulas involving the eta function can be listed. The first one follows from a change of variable of the integral representation of the Gamma function (Abel, 1823), giving a Mellin transform which can be expressed in different ways as a double integral (Sondow, 2005). This is valid for 

Integration by parts of the first integral above in this section yields another derivation.

The next formula, due to Lindelöf (1905), is valid over the whole complex plane, when the principal value is taken for the logarithm implicit in the exponential.

This corresponds to a Jensen (1895) formula for the entire function 
, valid over the whole complex plane and also proven by Lindelöf.

"This formula, remarquable by its simplicity, can be proven easily with the help of Cauchy's theorem, so important for the summation of series" wrote Jensen (1895).

The zeros on the negative real axis are factored out cleanly by making  (Milgram, 2013) to obtain a formula valid for :

Numerical algorithms
Most of the series acceleration techniques developed for alternating series can be profitably applied to the evaluation of the eta function. One particularly simple, yet reasonable method is to apply Euler's transformation of alternating series, to obtain

Note that the second, inside summation is a forward difference.

Borwein's method 
Peter Borwein used approximations involving Chebyshev polynomials to produce a method for efficient evaluation of the eta function. If

then

where for  the error term  is bounded by

Particular values

η(0) = , the Abel sum of Grandi's series 1 − 1 + 1 − 1 + · · ·.
η(−1) = , the Abel sum of 1 − 2 + 3 − 4 + · · ·.
For k an integer > 1, if Bk is the k-th Bernoulli number then 
Also:
, this is the alternating harmonic series
 

The general form for even positive integers is:

Taking the limit , one obtains .

Derivatives
The derivative with respect to the parameter  is for

References 

 
 
 
 Landau, Edmund, Handbuch der Lehre von der Verteilung der Primzahlen, Erster Band, Berlin, 1909, p. 160. (Second edition by Chelsea, New York, 1953, p. 160, 933)
 Titchmarsh, E. C. (1986). The Theory of the Riemann Zeta Function, Second revised (Heath-Brown) edition. Oxford University Press.
 

 Borwein, P., An Efficient Algorithm for the Riemann Zeta Function , Constructive experimental and nonlinear analysis, CMS Conference Proc. 27 (2000), 29–34.
  Amer. Math. Monthly 112 (2005) 61–65, formula 18.
  Amer. Math. Monthly, 110 (2003) 435–437.
 
  p. 12.
 .

Zeta and L-functions